Mr. Right is a 2009 British film directed by David Morris and Jacqui Morris. The jointly-made gay-themed film is the debut for both directors.

Synopsis
The film presents life of a number of individuals who live in London's Soho area in their quest for their "Mr. Right". One of the highlights of the film is when all the characters gather for an excruciatingly awkward and hilarious dinner party at which wine and secrets are spilled.

Harry (James Lance) is a TV producer but dreams to get way. He loves Alex (Luke de Woolfson), an aspiring yet insecure actor who also works as a caterer. Meanwhile Alex is struggling to create an identity for himself and decides to live independently through monetary help from his brother despite Harry wanting him back
Tom (David Morris, the co-director of the film) is a successful art dealer who is in a precarious relationship with Lars (Benjamin Hart), a handsome sometime-model. Tom finds excuses for Lars' flings so long as Lars doesn't leave him. Meanwhile Lars has this attraction to Harry and can't get over his feelings
William (Rocky Marshall) a divorced former rugby player finds it difficult very difficult to parent his nine-year-old daughter Georgie while trying to get on a new relationship with Lawrence (Leon Ockenden), a striving soap actor. Their relationship is complicated as Georgie is intent on sabotaging his relationship.
Louise (Georgia Zaris), a fag hag, is dating Paul (Jeremy Edwards), but suspects Paul is gay. Paul is slowly but surely getting drawn into the gay scene, despite visibly and verbally protesting every step of the way.

By the end of the film three months later, the characters are still striving to make new paths for themselves. Harry is appealing for Alex, now in a small studio residence to return, but the latter turns him gently down despite having feelings for him. Things are much better between William and Lawrence as Georgie becomes more accepting of their relationship. Things have soured between Lars and William. Devastated Lars catches Harry while the latter has just packed to leave everything behind for his long-planned trip away from his dreaded work. Meanwhile Paul is getting more and more into the gay scene despite putting a brave face that he is still straight.

Cast
Main
James Lance as Harry
Luke de Woolfson as Alex
David Morris as Tom
Benjamin Hart as Lars
Rocky Marshall as William
Leon Ockenden as Lawrence
Georgia Zaris as Louise
Jeremy Edwards as Paul
Others
Jan Waters as Harry's Mother
Maddie Planer as Georgie, Williams's daughter
Sheila Kidd as William's mother
Andrew Dunn as Alex's Father
Karen Meagher as Alex's Mother
Rick Warden as Alex's Brother
Katy Odey as Presenter
Lucy Jules as Emma
Sarah Carleton as Waitress
Dolly Wells as Fizz
Harry Serjeant as Runner
Ian Tytler as Charlie
Jim Cole as Heath
Archie Kidd as Barnaby
Heather Bleasdale as Barnaby's Mother
Yvonne O'Grady as Business Woman
Max Karie as Marcel
Kate Russell as The Yellow Team
Ian Russell as The Yellow Team
Mark Hayford as The Blue Team
Diane Morgan as The Blue Team
Terry Bird as Red Team
Cheryl Fergison as Red Team

References

External links

2009 films
British LGBT-related films
2000s English-language films
2000s British films